Gymnothorax emmae is a moray eel found in tropical ocean waters off Vietnam. It is found in coral reefs at a depth range of 14m-100m in the South China Sea. The maximum length of this species 43.0 cm.

Eggs of this species are large (1 mm in diameter) and pallid yellowish.

References

 Prokofiev, A.M. (2010). Two new species of fishes from families Muraenidae (Anguilliformes) and Mugiloididae (Perciformes) from the Waters of Vietnam published in Voprosy Ikhtiologii, 2010, Vol. 50, No. 5, pp. 580–589, 603–612.
Gymnothorax emmae in  Aquatab.net

emmae
Fish described in 2010